John Mason Brown (July 3, 1900 – March 16, 1969) was an American drama critic and author.

Life
Born in Louisville, Kentucky, he graduated from Harvard College in 1923. In 1925, Brown became a theatre critic for Theatre Arts magazine. He then worked for the New York Evening Post from 1929 to 1941 and briefly (1941) for the World-Telegram. He served as a lieutenant in the United States Navy during World War II, beginning in 1942. His book, To All Hands, documents his activities aboard the USS Ancon (AGC-4) during Operation Husky, the invasion of Sicily.

Upon his return, his "Seeing Things" column appeared in The Saturday Review starting in 1944 until his death. In a 1948 radio broadcast, Brown attacked comic books as "the marijuana of the nursery; the bane of the bassinet; the horror of the house; the curse of the kids; and a threat to the future." (These charges were echoed during this period by other public figures like Sterling North, J. Edgar Hoover, and most notably Dr. Fredric Wertham, until Congressional hearings led to the mid-1950s self-censorship and rapid shrinkage of the comics industry.)

Brown resigned from the Pulitzer Prize drama jury in 1963 when the advisory board rejected his recommendation, and that of theater historian John Gassner, that the prize go to Edward Albee's  Who's Afraid of Virginia Woolf.

He died in New York City. He was inducted, posthumously, into the American Theatre Hall of Fame in 1981.

See also
 45th Regiment Kentucky Volunteer Mounted Infantry, the regiment Brown's grandfather commanded during the American Civil War

References

Further reading

External links

John Mason Brown Papers (MS Am 1948-1948.1). Houghton Library, Harvard University.
John Mason Brown Additional Papers, 1933-1984 (MS Am 2096). Houghton Library, Harvard University.

Harvard College alumni
1900 births
1969 deaths
American theater critics
Writers from Louisville, Kentucky
20th-century American non-fiction writers
Members of the American Academy of Arts and Letters